The Virginia Robinson Gardens are the period landscape, historic mansion, and botanical gardens located at the Virginia Robinson Estate in Beverly Hills, California, United States.

History
The Virginia Robinson Gardens is the earliest estate in Beverly Hills, California. It was the private residence of Virginia Dryden Robinson and Harry Winchester Robinson, heir to  J. W. Robinson's Dept. Store.

The main house was designed in 1911 by architect Nathaniel Dryden, who was Virginia's father, in a Beaux Arts style. The residence is furnished with antiques and artifacts collected from around the world.

The Renaissance Revival pool pavilion was built in 1924. Decorative panels of sgraffito ornamentation adorn the Roman arches at the entry to the pavilion's solarium. The pavilion overlooks a long pool with mosaic tile wainscoting.

Gardens
The Virginia Robinson Gardens range in style and plant type from Italian Renaissance Mediterranean to Tropical Oceanea. The estate has five distinctive gardens:
 The Italian Renaissance Terrace Garden, with views of mature specimen trees and the Citrus Terraces. Planted under large magnolia trees are a variety of camellias, gardenias, and azaleas.
 The Formal Mall Garden, with perennial flower borders and rare specimen cycad 'palms'.
 The Rose Garden, with heirloom roses.
 The Kitchen Garden or Potager, with vegetables and an herb garden.
 The Tropical Palm Garden, including a grove of king palms (Archontophoenix cunninghamiana), reportedly the largest in the continental United States.  The tropical area also contains gingers, bananas, and plumerias.

Access
The Robinson Gardens are managed by the County of Los Angeles and open to the public for docent tours by advanced reservation only. The Friends of Virginia Robinson Gardens support this landmark. It was listed in 1978 on the National Register of Historic Places. It is also a state listed California Point of Historical Interest, and on the City of Beverly Hills Local Register of Historic Properties.

See also

 National Register of Historic Places listings in Los Angeles County, California
 List of botanical gardens in the United States

References

External links

 Virginia Robinson Gardens –  County of Los Angeles Department of Parks and Recreation
 Friends of Virginia Robinson Gardens – tours + information

Gardens in California
Botanical gardens in California
Museums in Los Angeles County, California
Architecture museums in the United States
Historic house museums in California
Open-air museums in California
Houses in Beverly Hills, California
Parks in Los Angeles County, California
Houses on the National Register of Historic Places in California
Buildings and structures on the National Register of Historic Places in Los Angeles County, California
Houses completed in 1911
1911 establishments in California
1910s architecture in the United States
History of Los Angeles County, California
Landscape design history of the United States
Sumner Hunt buildings
Beaux-Arts architecture in California
Renaissance Revival architecture in California